CMEX (China Milan Equity Exchange) is the first equity exchange platform set up in Europe to help European companies gain access to the ongoing privatization process of Chinese State-owned enterprises. China's equity exchanges were set up by the Chinese government in an effort to ensure the transparent, regulated, fair and open privatization of state-owned equity.

Background
In 2003, the Chinese Government launched the widest privatization policy of State-owned enterprises ever implemented in the world’s economic history. Thousands of State-Owned companies were put on sale through a standardized procedure designed to ensure transparency and efficiency in the acquisition process by private enterprises.
Foreign companies have the chance to participate to the bidding process for the privatization of Chinese state-owned companies through equity exchange platforms that are directly supervised by the State Assets Supervision Administration Commission (SASAC). CBEX (China Beijing Equity Exchange) is the Chinese largest equity exchange, having completed 4,151 transactions in 2008 for a combined value in excess of 10 billion Euros. 
Since 2007, CMEX is the exclusive partner in Italy of CBEX, operating as a collector and processor of financial information available through the CBEX platform for the scouting of Chinese private and State-Owned Enterprises. CMEX assists Italian and European investors interested in penetrating the Chinese M&A market. 
Within the Go Global strategy (Go Global), promoted by the Chinese Government to encourage its enterprises to invest overseas, CMEX also represents a privileged channel for Chinese companies wishing to expand their business abroad.

CMEX originates from a business project of the Law Firm "Carone & Partners - in association with Grandall Legal Group".

External links
China Milan Equity Exchange
China Beijing Equity Exchange

Economy of China